Leonid Sawlin (born 1999) is a German chess International Master (2021).

Biography
In 2013, Leonid Sawlin came second in the Maccabiah Games junior chess tournament. He has repeatedly represented Germany at European Youth Chess Championships and World Youth Chess Championships, winning the European Youth Chess Championship in 2015 in the U16 age group. He is currently playing for SK Zehlendorf.

References

External links

Leonid Sawlin chess games at 365Chess.com

1999 births
Living people
German chess players
Chess FIDE Masters